Glynde railway station serves Glynde in East Sussex. The station is unstaffed and a PERTIS Permit to travel machine was installed in 2008, in connection with a Penalty Fares Scheme. This has since been replaced by a Shere self-service ticket machine.

The former Station building is occupied by Airworks paragliding school.

Services 

All services at Glynde are operated by Southern using  EMUs.

The typical off-peak service in trains per hour is:
 1 tph to 
 1 tph to  via 

Accidents and incidents
On 4 January 1887, a passenger train crashed into a stray wagon that had toppled over onto the main line during shunting operations. It is not clear how the wagon had toppled over. A guard on the passenger train sustained broken ribs.

References

External links 

Railway stations in East Sussex
Former London, Brighton and South Coast Railway stations
DfT Category F1 stations
Railway stations in Great Britain opened in 1846
Railway stations served by Govia Thameslink Railway
1846 establishments in England
railway station